Energy in Hong Kong refers to the type of energy and its related infrastructure used in Hong Kong. Energy is crucial for the development of trade and industries in Hong Kong with its relatively small usable land. Hong Kong mostly imports its energy from outside or produces it through some intermediate process.

Energy sources

Coal
Hong Kong meets all of its coal demand through imports. In 2021, 6.5 million tonnes of coal were imported. In recent years, Indonesia (81.9%) has become the largest supplier, followed by Russia (10.3%), Australia (5.3%) and Canada (2.4%).

Most of the energy generated by coal in Hong Kong is for electricity generation. Hong Kong currently has a total of about 5 GW of capacity for coal-fired power stations.

Natural gas
Natural gas was first introduced for electricity generation in Hong Kong in 1996. Black Point Power Station was first commissioned in 1996 and has increased capacity to 3.2 GW in 2020. Lamma Power Station, originally commissioned as a coal power plant, has expanded to include gas turbines since.

Nuclear

Hong Kong has no indigenous supply of nuclear energy and there is no nuclear power station in the territory. However, Hong Kong has imported electricity from Mainland China from the Daya Bay Nuclear Power Plant in Shenzhen, Guangdong since 1994.

Hydro
Hong Kong has one hydropower plant in Tuen Mun coupled with a water treatment plant, but otherwise lacks rivers with significant flow to generate hydropower.

Oil
Oil products imported to Hong Kong have always mostly come from Singapore. Singapore accounted for 75.8% of fuel oil imports and 75.4% of unleaded motor gasoline imports. Mainland China and Macau are the two largest destination for oil products re-exporting from Hong Kong.

Solar

Hong Kong has been using solar energy over the past 20 years. As of 2013, there is a 1 MW installed capacity of photovoltaic at Lamma Power Station, doubling its size from 550 kW since its first commissioning in July 2010.

Wind

Hong Kong has a very small scale of wind power generation since early 2006, which is the Lamma Winds at Lamma Island with an installed capacity of 800 kW. In March 2013, HK Electric has just completed the full-year wind measurement for a proposal of offshore wind farm project in Southwest Lamma Island.

Regulatory body
Energy-related affairs are regulated by the Electrical and Mechanical Services Department (EMSD) under the Development Bureau of the Government of Hong Kong.

Companies
Energy-related companies of Hong Kong are:
 China Resources Petroleum Company Limited
 CLP Group
 The Hong Kong and China Gas Company
 Hongkong Electric Company
 Kunlun Energy
 SS United Group Oil & Gas Company
 Towngas China

Education
Energy-related education centres in Hong Kong include:
 Nuclear Resources Centre at Kowloonbay International Trade & Exhibition Centre
 EMSD Education Path at Kowloon
 Zero Carbon Building in Kowloon Bay

See also
 Energy policy of China
 Electricity sector in Hong Kong

References